Dennis Anthony Pearce (born 10 September 1974) is an English footballer of Caribbean descent, who formerly played at professional level and is now playing as a semi-professional. His position is left-back.

Pearce began his career as a trainee with Aston Villa on leaving school in 1991, turning professional in June 1993, but never made a first-team appearance and signed for local rivals Wolverhampton Wanderers in July 1995. He only made a handful of appearances at Molineux before his transfer to Notts County in July 1997.

Pearce had far more chances at Notts County, who had just been relegated to Division Three. Manager Sam Allardyce gave Pearce a regular first-team place and his first season was a great success as he inspired County to Division Three title glory – in a historic season which saw County become the first English football team to win promotion before the end of March.

In four seasons at Meadow Lane, Pearce played in some 140 first-team games and was Player of the Year in his final season at the club.

He transferred to Peterborough United in June 2001, where due to injury and poor form he managed just 16 competitive first team games in three seasons. He joined Stafford Rangers, moving to Conference National side Northwich Victoria in September 2004. However, he was released by Northwich in December 2004 and rejoined Stafford Rangers.

He moved to Redditch United in the 2005 close season, moving to local rivals Worcester City in January 2006. He was released by Worcester in March 2007 and joined A.F.C. Telford United. However, he was released by Telford at the end of the season.

He moved from Halesowen Town to Bromsgrove Rovers in the 2008 close season and was appointed as Rovers' captain. However, in December 2008 he was linked with a move from Bromsgrove back to Halesowen Town.

On 10 January 2009, he did indeed move back to The Yeltz. In late 2009 he joined Stratford Town on loan, remaining with the club until the end of the season.

In February 2011 he joined Barwell as player-coach.

In May 2011 he moved to Stourport Swifts as player-coach.

Honours
Individual
PFA Team of the Year: 1997–98 Third Division

References

External links

Halesowen Town FC Profile

1974 births
Living people
Footballers from Wolverhampton
English footballers
Association football defenders
Aston Villa F.C. players
Wolverhampton Wanderers F.C. players
Notts County F.C. players
Peterborough United F.C. players
Stafford Rangers F.C. players
Northwich Victoria F.C. players
Redditch United F.C. players
Worcester City F.C. players
AFC Telford United players
Halesowen Town F.C. players
Bromsgrove Rovers F.C. players
Stratford Town F.C. players
Barwell F.C. players
Stourport Swifts F.C. players
English Football League players